is a sect of Shingon Buddhism founded in the 16th century by the priest . The main Buzan-ha temple is Hase-dera in Sakurai, Nara.

Today the Buzan-ha sect has 3000 temples, 5000 priests and two million followers. Its largest chapters outside Japan are located in Hong Kong (under the name "Mantra School for Lay Buddhists") and Vietnam (under the name "Minh Nguyệt Cư Sĩ Lâm").

Schools of Shingon Buddhism